HSwMS Eugenie was a Swedish frigate, armed with 40 cannons. Naval officer  subsequently released an itinerary of the journey.

The vessel was classified as a corvette from 1877 until 1888, when it was converted into an accommodation ship at Skeppsholmen. She was taken out of service completely in 1919 and was sold to a Norwegian shipping company in Moss to be used as floating work home. In 1926, she was sold to a scrap dealer in Halmstad for scrapping.

The ship is named after Princess Eugenie, daughter of Oscar I of Sweden.

Circumnavigating the globe (1851-1853) 
This trip was the first global circumnavigation ever made with a Swedish warship. The  was probably carried out by the small brigantine, the  under the command of captain  who performed an unplanned circumnavigation of the years 1839-41.

Itinerary of the journey: 
 Sweden 
 Portsmouth, England 
 Funchal, Madeira, Portugal 
 Rio de Janeiro, Brazil 
 Montevideo, Uruguay
 Buenos Aires, Argentina 
 Colonia, Uruguay 
 Port Famine, Strait of Magellan, Argentina 
 Valparaiso, Chile 
 Callao, Peru 
 Puna, Peru 
 Panama 
 Galapagos Islands, Ecuador 
 Honolulu, Hawaii, United States 
 San Francisco, United States 
 Honolulu, Hawaii, United States
 Tahiti, French Polynesia 
 Sydney, Australia 
 Pouynypet, Caroline Islands
 Guam 
 Hong Kong 
 Canton, China 
 Manila, Philippines 
 Singapore 
 Batavia, Dutch East Indies 
 Cocos Islands, Australia 
 Mauritius 
 Cape Town, Cape Colony 
 St Helena 
 Plymouth, England 
 Cherbourg, France 
 Sweden

References

 

Frigates of Sweden
1844 ships
Ships built in Karlskrona